Martin Stamper (born 21 August 1986) is a British former taekwondo athlete.

Early life 

He was born in Liverpool, England.

Career 

Stamper was a bronze medallist at the 2011 World Taekwondo Championships. He also competed in the 2012 Summer Olympics and reached the semi finals. He lost in the bronze Medal Match to Rohullah Nikpai of Afghanistan, ending up in 5th place.

Taekwondo medals

References

External links
 Official website

1986 births
Living people
English male taekwondo practitioners
European Games competitors for Great Britain
European Taekwondo Championships medalists
Martial artists from Liverpool
Olympic taekwondo practitioners of Great Britain
Taekwondo practitioners at the 2012 Summer Olympics
Taekwondo practitioners at the 2015 European Games
World Taekwondo Championships medalists